The Official Languages Act 2003 is an Act of the Oireachtas of Ireland. The Act is being implemented on a phased basis.

Equal status between the Irish Language and English Language

According to the Act the provision of services by the state in both the Irish and English languages should generally be the same. This means in practice that all state forms, some documents and major reports must be available in both languages and that Irish speakers should be able to do all of their business with the state through Irish if they so wish, subject to there being enough Irish speakers working in the public sector to provide the services. Also both the Irish language and English language should have equal status or prominence on most new state signage and stationery and there must be an Irish-language option on public sector customer phone lines and state-run websites. The Act also allowed for the introduction of bilingual automated speaker announcements on public transport and other less prominent instances of a bilingual policy in respect of the two official national languages. The only state-area not to be covered by the Official Languages Act in the Republic of Ireland to date is road signage whose policy falls under the Department of Transport. The Official Languages Act 2003 does not cover the business or private sectors.

Placenames under the Official Languages Act
On 30 October 2003, Part 5 of the Official Languages Act came into effect. Under Part 5, the responsible minister (now the Minister for Tourism, Culture, Arts, Gaeltacht, Sport and Media), having received and considered advice from the Placenames Commission, may by ministerial order declare the Irish-language version of a placename specified in a Placenames Order. The principal legal effects of a Placename Order are one or other of the following:

in respect of any placename outside the Gaeltacht, the Irish  and the English versions of the placename have the same status and the same legal force and effect; and
in respect of a placename in the Gaeltacht, the Irish  version of the placename has legal force and effect while the English version of the placename has none.

Any Placenames Order is without prejudice to private use of the Irish or English-language versions of a placename. In many cases, it is also without prejudice to public use of a placename. However, where a Placenames Order is made in respect of placenames in the Gaeltacht, the English version of such placenames cannot be used in three instances: in future Acts of the Oireachtas; in road or street signs erected by or on behalf of a local authority; and in statutory instruments. Under Irish law, a "Statutory Instrument" includes "an order, regulation, rule, bye-law, warrant, licence, certificate, direction, notice, guideline or other like document made, issued, granted or otherwise created by or under an Act [of the Oireachtas and certain pre-Irish constitution Acts]".

The minister has made several Placename Orders. The Placenames (Ceantair Ghaeltachta) Order 2004 came into operation on 28 March 2005. This Placenames Order was in respect of placenames in the Gaeltacht and, therefore, one of its effects was to remove all legal force and effect from the English-language version of hundreds of placenames.

Official translations
Section 7 of the 2003 act requires that an official Irish translation of each act of the Oireachtas must be published simultaneously with the publication of its English version. However, several complex acts have sections making themselves exempt from this provision. A 2011 amendment to the act exempts electronic publishing of acts from the provision - Official Languages Act 2003 (Section 9) Regulations 2008.

Official Languages (Amendment) Act 2021

In 2011 then Minister of State for the Gaeltacht  Dinny McGinley TD announced at that year's Oireachtas na Gaeilge that he was launching a review of the Official Languages Act 2003. The process, much to the dismay of many Irish speakers, only finished in December 2021 when the Official Languages (Amendment) Act 2021 was signed into law. The biggest aim of the act is for a quota of 20% of public sectors jobs to be designated for Irish speakers by 2030. The act further states that state companies will have to spend 20% of their advertising budgets on advertising through the Irish language with a quarter of that 20% at a minimum having to be spent on the Irish language media. And the act also complies State organisations to be obliged to spell Irish speakers names and addresses accurately with fadas for those Irish speakers who want to have their names and addresses spelt with fadas. 

These measures are being brought in on a phased basis and as of mid-2022 have not been implemented yet.

20-year target
The successful implementation of the act forms part of the 20-Year Strategy for the Irish Language 2010–2030 to have at least 250,000 daily speakers of Irish by 2030.

See also
 An Coimisinéir Teanga - The Language Commissioner.
 Irish language 
 Status of the Irish language
 Gaeltacht - Irish speaking regions in Ireland.
 Gaeltacht Act 2012
 Údarás na Gaeltachta
 Bailte Seirbhísí Gaeltachta - Gaeltacht Service Towns.
 Líonraí Gaeilge - Irish Language Networks.
 20-Year Strategy for the Irish Language 2010–2030
 Gaelscoil - Irish language-medium primary school (sometimes used to describe Irish-medium schools in general).
 Gaelcholáiste - Irish language-medium secondary school.
 Irish language outside Ireland
 Gaelic Language (Scotland) Act 2005
 Welsh Language Act 1993

References

External links
 Official Languages Act 2003
 Acht na dTeangacha Oifigiúla 2003

Irish language
2003 in Irish law
Acts of the Oireachtas of the 2000s
Language legislation